Hans Diderik de Brinck-Seidelin (1 August 1720 - 5 March 1778)  was a Danish Supreme Court justice and landowner who was raised to the peerage under the name Brinck-Seidelin in 1753. He owned the estates Hagestedgård (1748-1769), Holbæk Ladegård (1748-1778) and Eriksholm (1762-1778).

Early life
He was born on 1 August in Copenhagen, the son of the Royal confessor Iver Brinck (1665-1728) and Sophie Seidelin (1693-1741). His maternal grandfather was Post Master-General Hans Seidelin.

Property
Brinck-Seidelin's maternal uncle, Hans Hansen Seidelin, had no male heirs. Brinck-Seidelin purchased Eriksholm and established Stamhuset Hagested from his now three estates in 1752. He was at the same time ennobled under the name de Brinck-Seidelin. Hagestedgård was, however, with royal approbation, sold to Carl Adolph von Castenschiold in 1769.

Family
He was married Ingeborg Pedersdatter Bering (15 September 1727 - 22 April 1796) on 25 May 1746 in  Horsens. She bore him nine children:
 Sophie Brinck (1749-1752)
 Hans Brinck-Seidelin (3 January 1750 - 30 September 1831)
 Elisabeth Cathrine Brinck-Seidelin (1751-1752)
 Sophie Elisabeth Cathrine Brinck-Seidelin (6 September 1752 -   d. 15 June  1820)
 Ivarica Brinck-Seidelin (1754 - 29 April 1826)
 Peder Brinck-Seidelin (1753,-1754)
 Petronelle Brinck-Seidelin (24 November 1755 - 1 May 1801)
 Iver Brinck-Seidelin (October  1756 - 1756)
 Iver Brinck-Seidelin (1757-1761)

References

Rxternal links
 Hans Diderik Brinck-Seidelin 

18th-century Danish landowners
Seidelin family
1720 births
1778 deaths